Dean Robert Lonergan  is a New Zealand former professional rugby league footballer, and current events promoter. He is the promoter of Jeff "The Hornet" Horn who won the WBO Welterweight World Championship against Manny Pacquiao in 2017.

Playing career
Lonergan represented the New Zealand national rugby league team from 1986 to 1991 and also represented Auckland. He played for the Glenora Bears and City Newton Dragons in the Auckland Rugby League competition and the Canberra Raiders in the NSWRL Premiership. He spent 1989 with the Rochdale Hornets in England.

In a Test match against Australia in Melbourne in 1991, Lonergan clashed famously with Kangaroo forward Steve Roach and had to be carried from the field. However he returned to the field and New Zealand won the match.

Warriors
Lonergan was a board member of the Auckland Warriors from 1996 until 1997.

Personal life
Lonergan was educated at Massey High School and was part of the breakfast show on LiveSPORT radio. He was also a columnist for The New Zealand Herald. He is the owner of Dean Lonergan Events Ltd and the promoter of the Fight for Life charity boxing events. Following the resignation of Robert Muldoon, Lonergan stood in the 1992 Tamaki by-election for a seat in the 43rd New Zealand Parliament, as a stunt for Radio Hauraki. Of 14 candidates, he came sixth with 0.60% of the votes. Dean Lonergan now runs D&L Events along with his son Liam Lonergan.

Honours
In the 2012 Queen's Birthday and Diamond Jubilee Honours, Lonergan was appointed a Member of the New Zealand Order of Merit for services to sport and philanthropy.

References

External links
Dean Lonergan Events Ltd. - dead link

Year of birth missing (living people)
Living people
New Zealand national rugby league team players
New Zealand rugby league players
Canberra Raiders players
Glenora Bears players
City Newton Dragons players
New Zealand rugby league administrators
People educated at Massey High School
Auckland rugby league team players
Rochdale Hornets players
Members of the New Zealand Order of Merit
Rugby league second-rows
Expatriate sportspeople in England
Expatriate sportspeople in Australia